BBC South Today is the BBC's regional television news service for the south of England, covering Hampshire, Isle of Wight, West Sussex, much of Dorset and parts of Berkshire, Surrey and Wiltshire.

Since 2000, an opt-out of the main programme has also covered Oxfordshire, parts of Wiltshire , small parts of eastern Gloucestershire, western Buckinghamshire and southern Northamptonshire.

Overview
The BBC began broadcasting a regional TV news programme for the south of England (then known as South at Six, but changing to the current title in the mid 1960s) in January 1961, getting on air four months before the launch of Southern Television's rival magazine programme Day by Day. Originally, the BBC's Southampton operations were based in South Western House, the former Cunard shipping line headquarters near the city's docks. In 1991, the programme moved to purpose-built studios in Havelock Road.

The original presenter was Martin Muncaster. Bruce Parker joined the programme in 1967 and remained as a regular presenter until 1989, continuing to provide holiday cover and present weekend bulletins until 2003.  The current main presenter, Sally Taylor, started co-presenting the programme in 1987 (replacing Debbie Thrower), initially alongside Parker and then successively with Paddy Haycocks, Mark Longhurst, Harry Gration, Andrew Harvey and Roger Finn, but in recent years she has been the regular solo presenter of the main programme.

Currently, BBC South Today produces 11 bulletins each weekday: six bulletins in the morning during BBC Breakfast, a 15-minute programme at 13:30, the half-hour main programme at 18:30, a headlines update at 20:00 and a late night bulletin (Monday to Thursday at 22:30, running for 15 minutes and every Friday at 22:25, running for 10 minutes). Weekend news bulletins are also broadcast. These include early evening bulletins on Saturday and Sunday and a late night bulletin on Sundays, following the BBC News at Ten. The times of these bulletins usually vary.

The programme is broadcast live from studios in Southampton.

Prior to September 2001, BBC South Today's region included areas served by the Heathfield transmitter and its relays which covered eastern Sussex and southern Kent. These areas are now covered by the BBC's South East Today.

Following digital switchover on 7 March 2012, the Whitehawk Hill transmitter switched from broadcasting BBC South Today to broadcasting the neighbouring South East Today.

Oxford opt-out
Between 16 October 2000 and 16 December 2022, BBC South produced a distinct news service for the area served by the Oxford transmitter. Previously, the area was covered by Newsroom South East, which also served Greater London and the south east. As part of a three-tier restructure of regional coverage, the Oxford transmitter area was transferred to the BBC South region and began dedicated opt-out bulletins within BBC South Today. A year later, London and the south east split into two distinct regions: BBC London and BBC South East.

Originally, BBC South Today Oxford was broadcast from BBC South's Studio B in Southampton. Studio production of the bulletins was transferred in 2004 to the reception area at Radio Oxford while a new television studio and production gallery was built. The programme was produced and broadcast from Oxford from October 2005 until December 2022.  Geraldine Peers presented the programme from May 2001 until the programme ended on 16th December 2022. 

On 21 April 2008, the BBC South Today Oxford opt-out service was renamed as BBC Oxford News (referred to on-screen as BBC Oxford). New titles and graphics were introduced as part of an on-screen overhaul across the BBC's national, international and regional news services. From 29 October 2012, this was  re-branded back to BBC South Today.

Weekday bulletins
The Oxford sub-opt covered the first 10–15 minutes of the main evening BBC South Today at 18:30, before joining Sally Taylor for the latter part of the Southampton edition of the programme. Until April 2013, a full 30-minute Oxford edition was produced every Friday evening, but this was scaled back to 10–15 minutes. Special half-hour Oxford editions were still occasionally broadcast if there was a major news story in the sub-region.

Viewers in these areas also received dedicated bulletins after the BBC News at Ten, but saw pan-regional bulletins from Southampton at breakfast and lunchtime and on weekends.  The 30 second update at 8pm was produced and presented from Oxford for the entirety of its run.  From 2007 there was also at 1520 (later 1500) a short regional update which was also produced and presented from Oxford until the bulletin was ended.

On 26 May 2022, it was announced that the BBC proposed to close the Oxford opt (and the equivalent produced in Cambridge). The final programme, a half hour special aired at 6.30pm on the 16 December 2022.

Presenters

Former presenters

Dani Sinha
Jane Hill
Roger Johnson
Harry Gration 
Mark Longhurst 
Jenni Murray
Susan Osman
Bruce Parker
Jon Kay
Kate Adie
Michael Buerk
Alex Lovell 
Andrew Harvey
Kirsty McCabe 
Richard Drax
Reham Khan
Babita Sharma

References

External links

BBC Regional News shows
Mass media in Dorset
Mass media in Hampshire
Mass media in Oxford
Mass media in Sussex
Mass media in Wiltshire
Mass media of the Isle of Wight
1960s British television series
1970s British television series
1980s British television series
1990s British television series
2000s British television series
2010s British television series
2020s British television series
1961 British television series debuts
Television news in England
2022 British television series endings